The Auctarium Prosperi Havniense, or Continuatio Prosperi Havniensis, is a continuation of the Chronicle of Prosper of Aquitaine, embodied in a manuscript at Copenhagen (hence Havniense); it was given this appellation by Theodor Mommsen, its editor.

Editions 
 Mommsen, Theodorus, ed. (1892). Prosperi Continuatio Havniensis (in Latin). Monumenta Germaniae Historica. Auctores antiquissimi. Chronica minora saec. IV.V.VI.VII. Vol. 9/1. Berolini: apud Weidmannos. pp. 266–271 and pp. 298–339.

French chronicles
Frankish historians
Late Antique Latin-language writers